Jessica Schultz (born January 2, 1985) is a former American curler. She is a two-time Olympian and three-time U.S. Champion. She is currently the Director of the Women’s National Team & Juniors programs at the United States Curling Association.

Curling career
Schultz was a member of the United States women's curling team at the 2006 Winter Olympics. For the 2006 U.S. World Team Trials in March, Schultz was named skip, or captain, of Team USA (the team's regular skip, Cassie Johnson, did not play in the tournament), and the team finished fourth under her direction.

She joined the Erika Brown rink in 2011. Brown and her team won the 2013 United States Women's Curling Championship and went on to represent the United States at the 2013 World Women's Curling Championship, finishing in fourth after losing the bronze medal game to Canada's Rachel Homan. They also qualified to participate at the 2014 United States Olympic Curling Trials. They finished first in the round robin standings and defeated Allison Pottinger in a best-of-three series final to clinch the berth to the Olympics.

After retiring from competitive curling, Schultz moved back to Alaska and has been involved in growing the sport of curling in that state, starting a nonprofit called curlAK towards that purpose. In May 2020 the United States Curling Association announced Schultz would be the new Director of the Women’s National Team & Juniors programs.

Personal life
She lived in Duluth, Minnesota. While attending Lake Superior College, she studied physical therapy.

Teams

Women's

Mixed doubles

References

External links

1985 births
Living people
American female curlers
Olympic curlers of the United States
Curlers at the 2006 Winter Olympics
Sportspeople from Anchorage, Alaska
Curlers at the 2014 Winter Olympics
People from Richfield, Minnesota
People from Duluth, Minnesota
American curling champions
Continental Cup of Curling participants
21st-century American women